The Small Back Room, released in the United States as Hour of Glory, is a 1949 film by the British producer-writer-director team of Michael Powell and Emeric Pressburger starring David Farrar and Kathleen Byron and featuring Jack Hawkins and Cyril Cusack. It was based on the 1943 novel of the same name by Nigel Balchin. The theme is the unsung heroes of the last war, the 'backroom boys', gradually coming into their own.

Plot
Sammy Rice (David Farrar) is a British scientist working with a specialist "back room" team in London as a bomb disposal expert during the Second World War. Rice is embittered because he feels military scientific research is being incompetently managed. He is also enduring unremitting pain from his artificial foot. The painkillers he has been prescribed are ineffective, and his use of alcohol as an analgesic has led to his alcoholism. His girlfriend Susan (Kathleen Byron) puts up with his self-pitying, self-destructive behaviour as long as she can, but finally breaks up with him, telling him that he lacks the ambition to better himself.

Rice is brought in by Captain Stuart (Michael Gough) to help solve the problem of small booby-trapped explosive devices (mines) being dropped by Nazi bombers, which have killed four people, including three children. They receive some useful information from a critically wounded young soldier (Bryan Forbes in his debut). Two further mines are found at Chesil Beach: they look like common thermos flasks. Stuart is first on the scene but has difficulty getting Rice on the telephone in his flat because Rice is alone following his break-up with Susan, angry, drunk and destructive. Rice quickly sobers up and travels to Chesil Beach, only to find that Stuart tried to defuse one of the mines and has been blown up. Rice sets to work on the second mine after listening to the notes Stuart dictated to an ATS corporal (Renée Asherson) during his attempt  earlier in the day. He discovers that the mine has in fact two booby traps, not one, and manages to defuse them both.

When Rice returns to London, his self-esteem somewhat restored by his success, he is offered an officer commission as head of the Army's new scientific research unit. He accepts. Susan returns to him and they go back to his flat to find she has repaired and reinstated everything he damaged while drunk.

Cast

 David Farrar as Sammy Rice
 Kathleen Byron as Susan
 Jack Hawkins as R.B. Waring
 Leslie Banks as Colonel A.K. Holland
 Michael Gough as Captain Dick Stuart
 Cyril Cusack as Corporal Taylor
 Milton Rosmer as Professor Mair
 Emrys Jones as Joe
 Walter Fitzgerald as Brine
 Renée Asherson as A.T.S. corporal
 Henry Caine as Sergeant Major Rose
 Sid James as "Knucksie" Moran, barkeeper and ex-boxer
 Sam Kydd as Private Crowhurst
 Michael Goodliffe as Till
 Geoffrey Keen as Pinker
 June Elvin as Gillian
 David Hutcheson as Norval
 Robert Morley as the government minister (credited as "A Guest")
 Roddy Hughes as Welsh doctor
 Bryan Forbes as Peterson, the dying gunner (credited as Brian Forbes)
 Roderick Lovell as Captain Pearson
 James Dale as Brigadier
 Elwyn Brook-Jones as Gladwin
 Anthony Bushell as Colonel Strang (Royal Engineers OC)
 Julian Somers as Dr Bryan 
 James Carney as Sergeant Groves
 Ted Heath's Kenny Baker Swing Group as Hickory Tree Band
 Kenny Baker as Trumpeter
 Frederic Lewis as Fred Lewis (credited as Frederick Lewis)
 Patrick Macnee as a committee member (uncredited)

Production

The Small Back Room marked the return of Powell and Pressburger to Alexander Korda after a profitable but somewhat contentious time at the Rank Organisation that culminated with The Red Shoes. The film was shot at a number of studios: Denham Film Studios in Buckinghamshire; Worton Hall Studios in Isleworth, Middlesex; and Shepperton Studios in Shepperton, Surrey. Location shooting took place at Chesil Bank and St Catherine's Chapel, Abbotsbury in Dorset; Stonehenge on Salisbury Plain; on the Victoria Embankment in London; and at Abbotsbury station.

In his autobiography, A Life in Movies, Michael Powell acknowledged the influence of German expressionist films such as Nosferatu in leading him towards making films such as The Red Shoes, Tales of Hoffmann and The Small Back Room.

Critical reception
The review for Variety said that although the film lacked "the production tricks usually associated with [Powell and Pressburger]" it was nevertheless "a craftsmanlike job". It praised the performance of David Farrar as "his best role", and lauded the careful casting of the "lesser roles."

The Small Back Room was nominated for a 1950 BAFTA Award as "Best British Film".

DVD
The Region 2 DVD was released in May 2004 by Studio Canal / Warner Home Video. In Region 1, The Criterion Collection released the film in August 2008. The release included an essay, an interview with cinematographer Christopher Challis, an audio commentary and excerpts from Michael Powell's audio dictations for his autobiography.

References

External links
 
 
 
 . Full synopsis and film stills (and clips viewable from UK libraries).
 The Small Back Room reviews and articles at the Powell & Pressburger Pages
The Small Back Room: Whisky Galore! an essay by Nick James at the Criterion Collection

1949 films
1949 romantic drama films
British romantic drama films
British black-and-white films
1940s war drama films
British World War II films
Films based on British novels
Films set in London
Films set on beaches
Films by Powell and Pressburger
British war drama films
1940s English-language films
1940s British films